Anne Sophie Mathis (born 23 July 1977) is a French former professional boxer who competed between 1995 and 2016. She held world titles in two weight division; the WBA female super-lightweight from 2006 to 2008; the WBC female super-lightweight title in 2008; and the WIBF and WIBA welterweight titles in 2011. She also challenged once for the WBO female light-middleweight title in 2014 and the undisputed welterweight title in 2016 against Cecilia Brækhus. She is best known for her knockout win over Holly Holm in 2011 and is considered one of the biggest punchers in the history of women's boxing.

Career

Beating her compatriot Myriam Lamare on 2 December 2006 at Palais Omnisports de Paris-Bercy, she became the women's WBA super Lightweight Champion. On 29 June 2007, she successfully defended her title against Myriam Lamare.

On 2 December 2011 she beat Holly Holm by seventh-round KO in Albuquerque. However, she lost her belts in a rematch against Holm in a unanimous decision on 15 June 2012 and failed to capture the WBA, WBC and WBO championship belts against Cecilia Brækhus on 22 September 2012. 

Mathis went on to win the vacant WBF Super Welterweight title against Yahaira Hernandez on 1 June 2013 by 5th round TKO. 

On 26 July 2014, she put her newly acquired WBF title on the line and attempted to gain the vacant WBO Super Welterweight title against Christina Hammer. This bout resulted in a controversial disqualification of Mathis which was later overruled to No Contest with many arguing that Mathis was robbed of a KO victory.

Anne Sophie Mathis has also tried her hand at Muay Thai.

Professional boxing record

References

External links
 

1977 births
Living people
French women boxers
World boxing champions
Sportspeople from Nancy, France
Welterweight boxers
Lightweight boxers
French Muay Thai practitioners
French female kickboxers
Female Muay Thai practitioners
20th-century French women
21st-century French women